Byrneside is a small town located in the City of Greater Shepparton, west of Shepparton in Victoria, Australia.

References

External links

Towns in Victoria (Australia)
City of Greater Shepparton